Anjana Jayaprakash is an Indian actress, who has appeared in Tamil and Malayalam language films. She had acted in several short films in lead roles and a few supporting roles in feature films, before making her breakthrough appearing in the blockbuster Tamil film Dhuruvangal Pathinaaru (2016) in one of the pivotal roles.

Career
Anjana was born in Dubai, United Arab Emirates. She completed her school education there and moved to Coimbatore, India to pursue her engineering degree in B.Tech. Fashion Technology in Kumaraguru College of Technology, Coimbatore. In college, she was senior to Director Karthick Naren, who later directed Dhuruvangal Pathinaaru. During college, she started modelling for college fashion shows and designer events. She also started acting in short films made in her college. One notable short film was Muse, directed by her college junior Kannan RK. She portrayed the role of Mythili, a sex worker who aspires to become an Actress and eventually ends up being a best selling author of a Novel. This short film fetched Awards in so many Film festivals around the country. The short film was even nominated for the National Film Award for Best Short Fiction Film.  After all these overwhelming accolades, she finally decided to pursue Acting as a Full-time profession.

She made her debut in feature films with a minor role as a reporter in Aneesh Anwar's 2015 Malayalam thriller film named Kumbasaram.

But she got various offers in modelling and started appearing in many television advertisements. She acted in a music video Sun Le Zara and also took the helms of directing a music video Rimjhim gire sawan by the artist Simran Sehgal. She finally made her breakthrough with the blockbuster film Dhuruvangal Pathinaaru, portraying Vaishnavi, one of the pivotal characters in the film. The success of this film, made her noticeable, and an actress to look forward in the Tamil film industry.

Filmography

Films

Webseries

Short films

Music videos

References

Living people
Actresses in Tamil cinema
21st-century Indian actresses
Actresses from Kochi
1992 births
Actresses in Malayalam cinema